John Finnemore's Souvenir Programme is a sketch comedy series broadcast on BBC Radio 4. John Finnemore is the sole writer and performs with Margaret Cabourn-Smith, Simon Kane, Lawry Lewin and Carrie Quinlan. The first series was broadcast on BBC Radio 4 in 2011, and further series have followed annually. A special edition recorded at the Edinburgh Festival Fringe was broadcast in 2012. All nine series have been released on CD.

The series contains sketches and character monologues, with only one major recurring character, a storyteller (a fictionalised version of John Finnemore) who narrates a tall tale in the last five minutes of most programmes, and who also provides the show's only recurring catchphrase, opening each story with "Well, since you ask me for...". This segment occasionally serves as a coda to several connecting sketches within a single episode, such as several small cons made in preparation of a milliner's heist or a time machine's journey into the future. The only other recurring character between episodes is an interviewer played by Carrie Quinlan named Patsy Straightwoman, whose interviewees are often played by Finnemore. The format of the Interview sketches was briefly modified with Straightwoman becoming an investigative journalist for a programme called Behind Closed Doors.

Many episodes include a comic song with words by Finnemore and music by Susannah Pearse. Some of these songs include a cello played by Sally Stares. Stares also appears in the Stoppable sketch as a tram driver and in an Orchestra sketch as a cellist. Many episodes also include a recurring sketch that comes up two to four times in the episode. There are four sketches which parody the BBC Radio 4 series The Archers, portraying the show as it supposedly sounds to people who do not regularly listen to it. Starting in the fifth series the performers often break character, usually to complain to John about the sketches or to provide 'footnotes' highlighting factual errors. Another series of sketches involves a man (Finnemore) and the 'voice in his head' (played by Simon Kane) which appears only to give bad advice or to be otherwise unhelpful, often resulting in public awkwardness or humiliation, such as encouraging him to retrieve a tip so that a barista can see him tipping or to disrupt him whilst trying to give directions.

Due to the coronavirus pandemic, the ninth series, broadcast in 2021, was not performed before a live audience or accompanied by live music. The series focused on five generations of a family and their collective lore and traditions (such as the song "Woof, Woof, Woof Goes the Wolfhound") whose developments and origins are explored in and connect several scenes across different episodes. The series' main characters were Russ Golding (Lewin), Deborah Golding née Wilkinson (Cabourn-Smith), Jeremy 'Jerry' Wilkinson (Kane), Vanessa Wilkinson née Noone (Quinlan) and Oswald 'Uncle Newt' Nightingale (Finnemore). The sketch format was modified, with the first five episodes focusing on each of the main characters with scenes from their lives being depicted in reverse order, whilst the sixth depicts their shared experiences told in nonlinear order. Homages are made to the original format, namely 'Uncle Newt' who is analogous with Finnemore's storyteller character, having told stories to Russ, Deborah, Jerry and Vanessa as children, starting them with the catchphrase "Well, since you ask me for...".

A pilot programme with a different supporting cast, titled John Finnemore, Apparently, was broadcast in 2008, starring Tom Goodman-Hill and Sarah Hadland. Many of the sketches in the pilot were subsequently remade for the series.

Awards 
John Finnemore's Souvenir Programme was voted Best British Radio Sketch Show in the British Comedy Guide Awards 2011. In 2014, it was awarded Silver for Best Comedy at the Radio Academy Awards. It was also shortlisted for Best Radio Comedy in the 2014 Writers' Guild of Great Britain Awards.

Original broadcasts

Multimedia
The show has been released in both Audible audiobook format and on CD, with physical releases published by BBC Physical Audio.

References

BBC Radio comedy programmes
BBC Radio 4 programmes